28 kDa heat- and acid-stable phosphoprotein is a protein that in humans is encoded by the PDAP1 gene.

References

Further reading

Phosphoproteins